ACS Sepsi SIC Sfântu Gheorghe or commonly Sepsi SIC is a women's basketball professional club based in  Sfântu Gheorghe, Romania. The former club was Sepsi BC, but it was dissolved in 2012 and replaced by Sepsi SIC.   The club competes in the Romanian First League and for the first time in the EuroCup Women in the 2013-14 season.

History
At the beginning of the 2012-2013 season, the objective of the club was to bring the fans back to the arena, in order to forget the chaotic precedent season. The objective was to qualify for the championships' playoffs. This was realised, Sepsi SIC played in the playoffs but was eliminated by CSU Alba Iulia. The club also took part in the Final Four of the Romanian Cup in  Alba Iulia. Finally, Sepsi SIC ended the season at the fifth place. No club decided to register to the 2013-14 EuroCup, therefore Sepsi SIC, whose financial situation was solid, was given a vacant Romanian place.

Honours
 Liga Națională
Winners (4): 2015–16, 2016–17, 2017–18, 2018–19
Runners-up (1): 2014–15
 Cupa României
Winners (7): 2007-08, 2014–15, 2015–16, 2017–18, 2018–19, 2020–21, 2021–22
Runners-up (2): 2013–14, 2016–17

Current roster

References

External links
 Official website
 FIBA Europe profil

Sfântu Gheorghe
Basketball teams in Romania
Women's basketball teams in Romania
Basketball teams established in 2012
2012 establishments in Romania